Ana Nogueira  is an American actress and playwright. She is known for her roles as Sarah on Sarah + Dee, Penny Ares on The Vampire Diaries. She originated the role of Eliza Hamilton in the original Vassar workshop production of the musical Hamilton.

Early life 
Nogueira grew up in East Falls, Philadelphia, and attended Friends' Central School. She earned a Bachelor of Fine Arts in Theatre from the Boston Conservatory at Berklee in 2007.

Filmography

Personal life 
She is married to actor/writer Nick Blaemire.

References

External links 

 

American film actresses
Living people
Year of birth missing (living people)
Place of birth missing (living people)
American people of Azorean descent
21st-century American women